Mercado Municipal Río Cuale is a market in Centro, Puerto Vallarta, in the Mexican state of Jalisco.

References

External links 
 
 

Centro, Puerto Vallarta
Retail markets in Mexico